, is a video game that was released on February 21, 2008 in Japan and November 12, 2009 in North America. The seventeenth installment of the Story of Seasons series, and the fourth available for the Nintendo DS, the game closely resembles Harvest Moon DS: Island of Happiness; a section of the island from Harvest Moon: Island of Happiness is one of multiple islands in this game. The player can choose to be a boy (Mark) or a girl (Chelsea).

Story
Many years before the events of the game, a powerful earthquake struck the Sunshine Islands, causing them to sink into the ocean. The player's task is to find the magical Sun Stones and restore the Sunshine Islands to their former glory.

Gameplay
Gameplay is split into four 30-day seasons to make up a year. Each day takes place over approximately fifteen minutes.

Unlike its predecessor, Harvest Moon DS: Island of Happiness, the player is not limited to controlling the game with the touch screen. Speaking to other characters within the game is either activated by tapping the character or pressing in the A button while facing them. The B button can be held while directing your character to bring him or her to a run.
Although the player can now use the buttons, the old touchscreen control system is still intact.

Marriage
Like in other Harvest Moon games, the player is able to marry. The candidates are the same as in Harvest Moon DS: Island of Happiness with an additional candidate for each gender. The new candidate for the female player is Will, and for the male the new candidate is Lily. After a season of marriage, the player is able to have a child with their spouse. As in the other Harvest Moon games, the player must raise the heart level of the candidate in order to marry.

Development 
The American pre-order bonus was a limited edition plush pig that was included with the game when ordered from participating retailers.

Reception

The game received "generally favorable reviews" according to the review aggregation website Metacritic. In Japan, Famitsu gave it a score of one six and three sevens, while Famitsu DS gave it a score of three sevens and one eight.

References

External links
  
 Official North American press release
 

2008 video games
Construction and management simulation games
Marvelous Entertainment
Nintendo DS games
Nintendo DS-only games
Story of Seasons games
Multiplayer online games
Nintendo Wi-Fi Connection games
Video games developed in Japan
Video games featuring protagonists of selectable gender
Video games set on fictional islands
Rising Star Games games
Natsume (company) games